Shin-Tson Wu, is an American physicist and inventor of Taiwanese origin. He is currently a Pegasus professor at CREOL, The College of Optics and Photonics, University of Central Florida. Wu's contributions to liquid-crystal research and the resulting patent portfolio for next-generation liquid crystal displays (LCDs), adaptive optics, laser-beam steering, biophotonics, and new photonic materials, have had a major impact on display technology worldwide.

Biography 

Wu was born in Nantou, Taiwan. He received his Ph.D. in Physics from the University of Southern California (Los Angeles, USA) and BS in physics from the National Taiwan University (Taipei). Prior to joining the University of Central Florida in 2001, he was with Hughes Research Laboratories (Malibu, California, USA) for 18 years. During that period, he made his first significant invention: mixed-mode twisted nematic liquid crystal cell, which is an integral part of high-resolution, high-contrast reflective and transflective LCDs, including direct-view, projection and wearable displays. His technologies have enabled new types of optical beam-control devices and have impacted many who have ever used an LCD product. In addition, Wu's investigations and theories about the properties of liquid crystal at infrared region have paved foundation for defense applications of liquid crystals.

Wu's current research interests at the University of Central Florida include advanced liquid crystal displays, adaptive optics, laser beam control, new photonic materials, and bio-photonics. He has co-authored 7 books, over 460 journal papers, and obtained 82 U.S. patents. Several of his patents have been implemented in display and photonic devices.

He was the founding Editor-In-Chief of the IEEE/OSA Journal of Display Technology. Currently, he is serving on the SID Honors and Awards Committee, and the SPIE Award Committee.

Awards and honors

Memberships
 2014, Among the first six inductees to the Florida Inventors Hall of Fame
 2012, Charter Fellow of National Academy of Inventors
 2007, Fellow of The International Society for Optics and Photonics (SPIE)
 2004, Fellow of IEEE
 2001, Fellow of Society for Information Displays (SID)
 1993, Fellow of Optical Society of America (OSA)

Awards
 2022, Edwin H. Land Medal, from OSA: The Optical Society
 2014, Esther Hoffman Beller Medal, from OSA: The Optical Society
 2011, Slottow-Owaki Prize, from Society for Information Display
 2010, Joseph Fraunhofer Award/Robert M. Burley Prize, from OSA: The Optical Society
 2010, Pegasus Professor, from University of Central Florida
 2008, Jan Rajchman Prize, from Society for Information Display
 2008, G. G. Stokes Award, from Society for Information Display
 2006, University Distinguished Researcher, from University of Central Florida
 2003, Outstanding Engineer Award, from IEEE
 2000, Special Recognition Award, from Society for Information Display
 1997, Special Achievement Award, from ERSO Taiwan
 1991, Annual Best Paper Award, from Hughes Research Laboratories
 1991, Team Achievement Award, from Hughes Research Laboratories

Honorary Titles
 2014, Inaugural Inductee of Florida Inventors Hall of Fame
 2013, Honorary Professor, Nanjing University, China

Books 
 D. K. Yang and S. T. Wu, Fundamentals of Liquid Crystal Devices, 2nd Edition (Wiley, 2014)
 H. Ren and S. T. Wu, Introduction to Adaptive Lenses (Wiley, 2012)
 Z. Ge and S. T. Wu, Transflective Liquid Crystal Displays (Wiley, 2010)
 J. H. Lee, D. N. Liu and S. T. Wu, Introduction to Flat Panel Displays (Wiley, 2008)
 D. K. Yang and S. T. Wu, Fundamentals of Liquid Crystal Devices (Wiley, 2006)
 D. Armitage, I. Underwood and S. T. Wu, Introduction to Microdisplays (Wiley, 2006)
 S. T. Wu and D. K. Yang, Reflective Liquid Crystal Displays (Wiley, 2001)
 I. C. Khoo and S. T. Wu, Optics and Nonlinear Optics of Liquid Crystals (World Scientific, 1993)

See also
 Liquid-crystal display
 Transflective liquid-crystal display
 Blue phase mode LCD
 University of Central Florida
 University of Central Florida College of Optics and Photonics

External links
 University of Central Florida, College of Optics and Photonics - Shin-Tson Wu's website
 Shin-Tson Wu Research Group - University of Central Florida

Living people
1953 births
University of Central Florida faculty
People from Nantou County
People from Orlando, Florida
21st-century American physicists
Taiwanese emigrants to the United States
University of Southern California alumni
National Taiwan University alumni
People from Oviedo, Florida